Mu Sapanara Soudagar  is a 2008 Indian Oriya film directed by Sanjay Nayak. This is the first film of Sabyasachi Mishra and Archita Sahu together. This film is inspired by Bollywood movie Agni Shakhi which itself was based on the English movie Sleeping with the Enemy. Sabyasachi(Omm) played the title character as an anti hero. Archita(Shriya) played love interested of both Omm and Chandan, which was played by Arindam Roy.

Cast
Sabyasachi Mishra as Omm
Arindam Roy as Chandan
Archita Sahu as Shriya
Ajit Das as Omm's father
Akhila Patnaik as Raja
Bina Moharana as Omm's mother
Mihir Das (guest appearance)
Ommkar

Box office
After the success of Dhana re rakhibu Sapatha mora, Subham films released their second venture on the occasion of Raja Festival.  The movie ran for more than 100 days in theaters in Odisha.

References

External links 
 Mu sapanara saudagara movie download link

 

2008 films
2000s Odia-language films
Odia remakes of Hindi films